Marino Crescent is a Georgian crescent of 26 houses at the junction of Marino, Fairview and Clontarf in Dublin 3, Ireland. It is the only Georgian crescent in Dublin.

History

The crescent was built by Charles Ffolliott in 1792 as a spite wall to block the view of Dublin Bay from the now demolished Marino House and its better known folly, the Casino at Marino, which was much coveted by its owner, James Caulfeild, 1st Earl of Charlemont . The terrace was built with red brick front finishes in a similar method to Mountjoy Square and Merrion Square however, owing to the fashion of the time the fronts were plastered over during the Regency period and all of the facades remain in the same state as of 2020.

All of the houses are three-storey over basement properties and all are two bay with the exception of the two largest central houses, numbers 13 and 14, which are three bay.

Number 26 was demolished in the 1980s to make way for a faux Georgian block of apartments known as Crescent House. The remaining 25 houses on the terrace are listed on the Record of Protected Structures.

Notable residents 
Florence Balcombe, Bram Stoker's future wife, lived at number 1.
Harry Boland lived at 5 Marino Crescent and for a short time at number 15. While living there he used the chimney to store a small portion of the Russian Crown Jewels. The jewels were given as security for a loan of $20,000 given by an Irish government delegation (part of the first Dáil Éireann) to Ludwig Martens, the new Soviet government representative in New York. Number 15 was also used to store guns as part of the Howth gun-running.
William Carleton, the Poor Scholar, lived at number 3.
Charles Ffolliott lived at number 10.
Martin Haverty, historian, lived at number 21.
Bram Stoker lived at number 15 for a period during his childhood, as did his brother, Thornley Stoker.

Bram Stoker Park

The originally private Marino Crescent Park garden square in front of the crescent is now a public park having been acquired by Dublin corporation in the 1980s. It was officially renamed Bram Stoker Park by Dublin City Council in the 2010s but retains its private feel due to a wall and trees surrounding most of the park with the original Georgian fencing surrounding the remainder facing the houses.

Closing times range from an earliest of 16.30 in December and January to a latest of 21.30 in June and July.

See also
Royal Crescent, Bath, England
The Crescent, Limerick

References

Squares in Dublin (city)
Crescents (architecture)
Georgian architecture in Ireland
Streets in Dublin (city)